The Society of the Sacred Cross is an Anglican religious order founded in Chichester, Sussex, in 1910.  It established a community at Tymawr, Lydart, Monmouthshire, in 1923 with guidance from Fr G. Northcott of the Community of the Resurrection. The society today consists of fewer than ten professed sisters, with several oblates and associates.

References

External links
 Description of the Society

Christian organizations established in 1923
Anglican religious orders established in the 20th century